The North Platte Indians were a minor league baseball team based in North Platte, Nebraska. Preceded by the North Platte Buffalos, the North Platte teams played as members of the Class D level Nebraska State League from 1928 to 1932 as the Buffalos and from 1956 to 1959 as the Indians. The North Platte Indians were a minor league affiliate of the Cleveland Indians from 1956 to 1959, winning the 1958 league championship. The Buffalos played home games at the Union Pacific Park and the Indians hosted home games at Bill Wood Field.

History
Based in North Platte, Nebraska, the North Platte Indians were an affiliate of the Cleveland Indians, playing as members of the Nebraska State League. Previously, the North Platte Buffalos played as members of the Nebraska State League from 1928 to 1932. The North Platte Indians finished 41–22 in 1958 and captured the 1958 Nebraska State League Championship, playing under manager Mark Wylie.

On July 29, 1928, North Platte pitcher Joe Smith threw a no–hitter in a 7–inning game against the Beatrice Blues. North Platte won the game 3–0.

The Nebraska State League folded permanently after the 1959 season. The 1959 league member franchises folded as well, the Hastings Giants, Holdrege White Sox, Grand Island Athletics, Kearney Yankees, McCook Braves and North Platte Indians all folded. North Platte has not hosted another minor league team.

The ballparks
The Union Pacific Park was noted to have hosted the North Platte Buffalos from 1928 to 1932 for minor league home games. The ballpark within the park was called Jeffers Field, located 7th and Jeffers, North Platte, Nebraska. The ballpark was destroyed by fire in 1955.

After the fire, Bill Wood Field was constructed in 1956, within Cody Park. Bill Wood Field was referenced to have hosted the North Platte Indians. The ballfield is still in use today, located within Cody Park, near the National Guard building. Today, Bill Wood Field is home to American Legion baseball. It is located at 18th & Jeffers, North Platte, Nebraska.

Timeline

Year–by–year record

Notable alumni

 Bob Allen (1956) 
 Doc Edwards (1958) 
 Spence Harris (MGR, 1956) Minor league career records runs (2,287), doubles (743), hits (3,617)
 Ramon Lopez (1958)
 Jim Perry (1956) 3x MLB All-Star; 1970 AL Cy Young Award; Minnesota Twins Hall of Fame
 Duke Sims (1959)
 Dave Vineyard (1959)
 Rudy York (MGR, 1957) 7x MLB All-Star

See also
North Platte Indians players

References

External links
Baseball Reference
Union Pacific Park photo

North Platte, Nebraska
Baseball teams established in 1956
Defunct minor league baseball teams
Baseball teams disestablished in 1959
1956 establishments in Nebraska
1959 disestablishments in Nebraska
Defunct baseball teams in Nebraska
Professional baseball teams in Nebraska
Cleveland Guardians minor league affiliates
Nebraska State League teams